Hillvue is a suburb of Tamworth, New South Wales, Australia. It is a largely residential suburb of Tamworth and is south of South Tamworth. It has the second highest population estimate of any area of Tamworth, with over six thousand people in 2011.

The longyard shopping area, the Golden Guitar, Roll of Renown, Country Music Centre and the Tamworth Regional Entertainment Centre are all located in Hillvue. The Prime TV Station and 2TM Radio Station are also located in the suburb along the New England Highway. Further along the New England Highway on the suburb's outskirts is the $28.8 million Australian Equine and Livestock Events Centre.

Locality
The North boundary of Hillvue is Hillvue Road, Wilburtree Street and Calala Lane. Goonoo Goonoo Creek is the suburb's boundary in the east; the suburb of Kingswood is the boundary in the south and the Main North railway line is the boundary in the west.

Sport
The Longyard Golf course is located in Hillvue in Greg Norman Drive. The golf course was designed by Greg Norman. The Tamworth Regional Sporting Complex is located in Hillvue near the Tamworth Regional Entertainment Centre and the complex includes water-based hockey fields, the Tamworth Athletics track and a gymnastics complex. The Hillvue Rovers Football club although they do not play in Hillvue draw most of their players and supporters from the suburb.

Schools

Hillvue Primary School
Liberty College

References

External links
Tamworth Community Profile
 ABC News article on Tamworth National Equine Centre

Suburbs of Tamworth, New South Wales